Hopea parviflora is a species of plant in the family Dipterocarpaceae. It is endemic to India. It is called 'kampakam' or 'thampakam' in Malayalam and  கோங்கு 'vellaikongu' or 'irubogam' in Tamil. Hopea parviflora is a tree growing 30 – 37 metres tall. The bole can be 150 cm in diameter. The tree produces a beautiful timber and is commonly harvested from the wild, both for local use and for trade. The plant is classified as 'Least Concern' in the IUCN Red List of Threatened Species.

See also
 List of Indian timber trees

References

parviflora
Endangered plants
Endemic flora of India (region)
Taxonomy articles created by Polbot